The R210 road is a regional road in Ireland linking the R209 and R208 roads in south county Leitrim. Approximately  in length, the R210 road runs along the south-east border of Carrickaport Lough and also runs along the north-west border of Lough Scur over Drumcong townland, the placename in  translating to "".

See also
Roads in Ireland

References

External links 

Regional roads in the Republic of Ireland
Roads in County Leitrim